The comarca of Bajo Guadalquivir (also known as the Costa Noroeste or the Northwest Coast) is a comarca straddling the provinces of Seville and Cadiz, in Andalucia, Spain.  A Spanish comarca is roughly the equivalent of a county in the United States or Canada, a riding in the United Kingdom, or a Landkreis in Germany.

Is formed by seven municipalities of the province of Seville and four municipalities of the province of Cádiz:

Utrera
Los Palacios y Villafranca
El Coronil
Los Molares
Las Cabezas de San Juan
El Cuervo de Sevilla
Lebrija
Trebujena
Sanlúcar de Barrameda
Chipiona
Rota

External links
Mancomunidad de Municipios del Bajo Guadalquivir

Comarcas of the Province of Cádiz
Guadalquivir